Phantom Lady is a 1944 American film noir directed by Robert Siodmak and starring Franchot Tone, Ella Raines, and Alan Curtis. Based on the novel of the same name by Cornell Woolrich, it follows a young Manhattan secretary and her endeavors to prove that her boss did not murder his wife.

Plot
After a fight with his wife on their anniversary, Scott Henderson, a 32-year-old engineer, picks up an equally unhappy woman at Anselmo's Bar in Manhattan and they take a taxi to see a stage show. The woman refuses to tell him anything about herself. The star of the show they are watching, Estela Monteiro, becomes furious when she notices that she and the mystery woman are wearing the same unusual hat. When Henderson returns home, he finds Police Inspector Burgess and two of his men waiting to question him; his wife has been strangled with one of his neckties. Henderson has a solid alibi, but the bartender, taxi driver, and Monteiro deny seeing the phantom lady. Henderson cannot even clearly describe the woman. He is tried, convicted, and sentenced to death.

Carol Richman, Henderson's loyal secretary, who is secretly in love with him, sets out to prove his innocence. She starts with the bartender. She sits in the bar night after night, staring at and unnerving him. Finally, she follows him home one night. When he confronts her on the street, some bystanders step in to restrain him. He breaks free, runs into the street and is run over. Later, Burgess offers to help (unofficially). He has become convinced that only a fool or an innocent man would have stuck to such a weak alibi. Burgess provides her with information about the drummer at the show, Cliff, who had tried to make eye contact with the mystery lady.

Carol dresses provocatively and goes to another of Cliff's shows, hoping to glean more information. By making intense eye contact with Cliff during the performance, she manages to capture his attention. Afterward, Cliff approaches her, and she returns to his apartment with him. Somewhat drunk, Cliff brags that he was paid $500 for his false testimony. However, he becomes suspicious when he accidentally knocks over her purse and, among the spilled contents, finds a piece of paper with details about him. Richman manages to escape, leaving her purse behind. After she has gone, the real murderer, Henderson's best friend Jack Marlow, shows up at the apartment and strangles Cliff to death.

Marlow has put aside business in South America to come home, ostensibly to help Richman save Henderson; secretly he works to frustrate her efforts, while hiding his own deteriorating mental state. Richman tracks down Monteiro's hatmaker, Kettisha. One of her employees admits to copying the hat for a regular customer and provides her name and address. With Burgess away on another case, Richman and Marlow go to see Ann Terry. They discover her under the care of Dr. Chase; the man she was to marry had died suddenly, leaving her emotionally devastated. Richman is unable to get any information from her, but does find the hat. Marlow suggests they wait for Burgess at Marlow's apartment. However, while she is freshening up, Richman finds her purse and the paper with Cliff's particulars in a dresser drawer. Marlow admits he became enraged when Henderson's wife refused to run away with him; she was only toying with him. Burgess arrives just in time. Marlow throws himself out the window to his death. With Henderson freed, things appear to return to normal. However, Richman is delighted to learn (from a dictaphone message) that her boss returns her love.

Cast
 Franchot Tone as Jack Marlow
 Ella Raines as Carol "Kansas" Richman
 Alan Curtis as Scott Henderson
 Aurora Miranda as Estela Monteiro (as Aurora)
 Thomas Gomez as Inspector Burgess
 Fay Helm as Ann Terry
 Elisha Cook, Jr. as Cliff Milburn
 Andrew Tombes as Bartender
 Regis Toomey as Detective 
 Joseph Crehan as Detective (Tom)
 Doris Lloyd as Kettisha 
 Virginia Brissac as Dr. Chase
 Milburn Stone as District Attorney

Production
Phantom Lady was Siodmak's first Hollywood film noir. It was also the first producing credit by Joan Harrison, Universal Pictures' first female executive and former screenwriter for Alfred Hitchcock.

Cliff's frantic drum solo was dubbed by former Harry James and His Orchestra drummer Dave Coleman.

Release

Critical response
Critic Bosley Crowther was not impressed with the atmospherics of the film and panned the film for its screenplay, writing: "We wish we could recommend it as a perfect combination of the styles of the eminent Mr. Hitchcock and the old German psychological films, for that is plainly and precisely what it tries very hard to be. It is full of the play of light and shadow, of macabre atmosphere, of sharply realistic faces and dramatic injections of sound. People sit around in gloomy places looking blankly and silently into space, music blares forth from empty darkness, and odd characters turn up and disappear. It is all very studiously constructed for weird and disturbing effects. But, unfortunately, Miss Harrison and Mr. Siodmak forgot one basic thing—they forgot to provide their picture with a plausible, realistic plot."

Home media
Universal Pictures Home Entertainment released a made-on-demand DVD-R of the film through in conjunction with Turner Classic Movies.

Arrow Films released a region A Blu-ray edition of the film through their Arrow Academy label on March 5, 2019.

Radio adaptation
The Phantom Lady was presented on Lux Radio Theater, March 27, 1944.

The Phantom Lady was presented on Lady Esther Screen Guild Theatre September 11, 1944. The 30-minute adaptation starred Ralph Bellamy, Louise Allbritton, David Bruce and Walter Abel.

References

External links

Streaming audio
 Phantom Lady on Lux Radio Theater: 27 March 1944
 Phantom Lady on Screen Guild Theater: 11 September 1944

1944 films
1940s mystery thriller films
1940s psychological thriller films
American black-and-white films
American mystery thriller films
American psychological thriller films
1940s English-language films
Film noir
Films about miscarriage of justice
Films based on American novels
Films based on works by Cornell Woolrich
Films directed by Robert Siodmak
Films scored by Hans J. Salter
Films set in Manhattan
Universal Pictures films
1940s American films